Rhynchus may refer to:
 Rhynchus (beetle), a genus of beetles
 Rhynchus (Greece), a town of ancient Greece
 see also List of commonly used taxonomic affixes